The 2012 Men's Australian Hockey League was the 22nd edition of the men's field hockey tournament. The tournament was held in Australia's capital city, Canberra.

The QLD Blades won the gold medal for the seventh time by defeating the WA Thundersticks 3–2 in the final. VIC Vikings won the bronze medal after defeating the NSW Waratahs 3–1 in the third place match.

Teams

  Canberra Lakers
  Southern Hotshots

  NSW Waratahs
  Tassie Tigers

  NT Stingers
  VIC Vikings

  QLD Blades
  WA Thundersticks

Results

Preliminary round

Matches

Classification round

Fifth to eighth place classification

Crossover

Seventh and eighth place

Fifth and sixth place

First to fourth place classification

Semi-finals

Third and fourth place

Final

Statistics

Final standings

Goalscorers

References

External links

Australian Hockey League
2012 in Australian field hockey
Sports competitions in Canberra